Shahar Tzuberi (or Zubari, ; born September 1, 1986) is an Israeli windsurfer and Olympic bronze medalist, surfing in the "Neil Pryde" RS:X discipline. He is a nephew of Gad Tsobari, the 1972 Olympic wrestler who escaped from Arab terrorists during the Munich massacre. He is a three-time Olympian.

Early life
Tzuberi was born in Eilat, Israel, to a family of both Mizrahi Jewish (Yemenite-Jewish) and Ashkenazi Jewish descent. He began surfing at the age of 7, encouraged by his father, Ze'ev "Poodle" Tzuberi. After winning a number of local surfing competitions, he began training professionally. Tzuberi joined the Israel Defense Forces in 2005 and received an "Athlete of Excellence" status, allowing him to compete in international competitions. He went through recruit training in the Zikim base and then became a quartermaster in the Israeli navy base in Eilat, his hometown. His cousin is Israeli surfer Hadar Heller.

Windsurfing career

Early years
Tzuberi's first achievement was a silver medal in the 2000 Windsurfing World Championships for boys. With the Olympics in mind, Tzuberi began mastering the Mistral windsurfer (which was the windsurfer model used in the Olympic Games at the time). In 2002, Tzuberi won the under-17 World Championships, and in 2004, he won the silver medal in the Youth World Championships held in Bulgaria.

In 2004, the ISAF decided to replace the Olympic windsurfing discipline model from the Mistral surfboard to the "Neil Pryde" RS:X surfboard. The majority of Olympic windsurfers found it hard to adjust to the new model, as they were already used to years of sailing on the Mistral. However, this provided younger surfers, such as Tzuberi, with a chance to close the gaps in experience and catch up with the veteran windsurfers.

At the beginning of 2006, in the first Israeli windsurfing competition held using the RS:X model, he finished first, while two-time Israeli Olympic medalist Gal Fridman finished in 4th place.

Tzuberi's international results:
 2007 – Pre-Olympic championship silver medal finish in France.
 2007 – 6th-place finish in the European Championships held in Cyprus.
 2007 – 8th-place finish in the World Championships held in Portugal.

At the beginning of 2008, he won the bronze medal at the Windsurfing World Championships held in Auckland, New Zealand.

Beijing Olympics, 2008
Tzuberi competed for Israel at the 2008 Olympics, and entered the 2008 Olympic Games under the shadow of Gal Fridman, a two-time Olympic medalist for Israel. He was ranked outside the top 10 coming into the tournament, but upgraded to an overall 1st place after the first 4 (of the total 11) events, finishing 1st and 3rd respectively. In the following 4 events, Tzuberi's best finish was a 6th place, in between 17th, 18th and 19th-place finishes – results that seemed to end his hopes of an Olympic medal. He then won the 9th and placed 4th in the 10th event, thus re-entering the medal race as 4th place overall.

Just before the final medal race was about to start, Greek windsurfer Nikolaos Kaklamanakis, who was next to Tzuberi in the start line, was disqualified for an attempted head start. Tzuberi thought the judges disqualified him as well (in fact they did not), and decided to play it safe by "re-entering" the race and returned to the start line. By the time Tzuberi started surfing, he was approximately 1 minute behind the entire fleet.

Tzuberi had to place 4 places ahead of one of the top-3 surfers in order to win a medal and he accomplished just that by coming back from last place and finishing in an incredible 2nd place, and 3rd overall, while Great Britain's Nick Dempsey lost his medal by placing 7th – an overall 4th-place finish.

Tzuberi's results were:

(Notes: the worst race score is omitted. The medal race score is doubled.)

Controversy
After the Olympics, Tzuberi made a number of offensive comments about the Chinese in an interview with Yediot Ahronot, including what the Associated Press described as a "scatological expletive" and criticizing Chinese traditions, speech and food, such as "After a month and a half I couldn't look at Chinese people any more", "Their traditions are bizarre and even their speech is weird". Tzuberi later apologized, and said “this was a slip of the tongue, I retract what I said.” The Israeli Sport and Culture Minister Raleb Majadele condemned Tzuberi's remarks to the Chinese Ambassador, calling the remarks "despicable", and saying they "do not reflect the views of the Israeli people toward the Chinese people."

London Olympics, 2012
Competing for Israel at the 2012 Olympics in windsurfing, he came in 19th.

Rio de Janeiro Olympics, 2016
Tzuberi competed for Israel at the 2016 Olympics, his third appearance in the Olympic Games. He did not qualify for the finals.

Achievements

See also

 List of Olympic medalists in sailing
 List of World Championships medalists in sailing (windsurfer classes)
 List of Jews in sports
 List of Israeli Mizrahi and Sephardi Jews
 Sports in Israel

References

External links

 
 
 
 
 
 Meet the Olympic team: Shahar Zubari at Ynetnews

1986 births
Living people
Israeli people of Ashkenazi descent
Israeli people of Yemeni-Jewish descent
People from Eilat
Israeli windsurfers
Jewish sailors (sport)
Olympic bronze medalists for Israel
Olympic medalists in sailing
Olympic sailors of Israel
Israeli male sailors (sport)
Sailors at the 2008 Summer Olympics – RS:X
Sailors at the 2012 Summer Olympics – RS:X
Sailors at the 2016 Summer Olympics – RS:X
Medalists at the 2008 Summer Olympics
Israeli Mizrahi Jews
Israeli Ashkenazi Jews